Jana Novotná won in the final 4–6, 6–4, 6–3 against Magdalena Maleeva.

Seeds
A champion seed is indicated in bold text while text in italics indicates the round in which that seed was eliminated. The top four seeds received a bye to the second round.

  Monica Seles (quarterfinals)
  Arantxa Sánchez Vicario (semifinals)
  Conchita Martínez (second round)
  Magdalena Maleeva (final)
  Brenda Schultz-McCarthy (quarterfinals)
  Jana Novotná (champion)
  Amanda Coetzer (quarterfinals)
  Irina Spîrlea (quarterfinals)

Draw

Final

Section 1

Section 2

External links
 1996 Páginas Amarillas Open Draw

Singles